Netherlands at the European Athletics Championships is an overview of the Dutch results at the European Athletics Championships.

List of medalists

Medal table

References

See also
Netherlands at the World Championships in Athletics
 Netherlands at the European Road Championships
 Netherlands at the European Track Championships

 
Athletics in the Netherlands
Nations at the European Athletics Championships